The Northwest Conference was a high school athletic conference in Iowa. Over the years membership ranged anywhere from five to nine schools. The conference was known over the years as one of the best 1A basketball conferences in Iowa. Traditional powers Newell-Fonda and Pomeroy-Palmer combined for 14 state appearances and six state titles between 1990 and 2004. The conference also sponsored volleyball, women's basketball, men's and women's golf, men's and women's track, baseball, softball, and cross country.

Former Members

History 
The Northwest Conference was formed for the 1996–97 athletic year. The conference was formed to meet the needs of nine small 1A schools located in the heart of Northwestern Iowa. After Alta and Aurelia ended a 7-year sports-only sharing agreement, the bigger Twin Lakes Conference was not seen as a good fit for them. Newell-Fonda, Pomeroy-Palmer, and Schaller-Crestland had long histories in the Bo-Coon conference, which had recently dissolved. So the conference was created in 1996 with three of the smaller Twin Lakes Conference schools (Alta, Aurelia, and Sac City), two Cornbelt conference schools who had been longtime rivals of Alta and Aurelia respectively (Sioux Central and Albert City-Truesdale), three old Bo-Coon schools who had recently merged with other nearby schools (Schaller-Crestland, Pomeroy-Palmer, and Newell-Fonda), and longtime independent Storm Lake St. Mary's.

After nearly a decade of stability and 1A basketball dominance, the conference lost one school, Albert City-Truesdale, in 2004. The school had originally planned to share sports and other activities with Sioux Central High School, but instead the district opted to close its high school. In 2008, there was another change in membership. Sac City left the conference, as they consolidated with WLVA to form East Sac County High School and joined the Twin Lakes. Another former Twin Lakes member, Laurens-Marathon, would replace them for the next season.

In 2008, the real attrition began. Pomeroy-Palmer left the conference to join with neighboring Pocahontas Area Community School District, reducing membership to seven. For the 2009–10 school year membership dipped to six, as Schaller-Crestland joined with neighboring Galva–Holstein Community School District for all sports but volleyball effective 2009–10 and began full-grade sharing in 2010–11.  The final blow to the conference came the next season, as Alta and Aurelia reverted to sharing sports in 2010–11 and announced plans to combine high schools and middle schools in 2011–12. Throughout the final years of the conference, Sioux Central, which became easily the biggest school in the conference when it absorbed most of what was once the Albert City-Truesdale high school in 2005, actively campaigned for a bid to the Twin Lakes Conference. It attempted to leave the conference effective 2010–11 sports season in hopes of joining a league with larger schools, but was unable to find a home for their athletics teams so remained in the conference for another season. For the 2011–12 school year a merger with the Twin Lakes was announced and the five remaining members of the Northwest Conference joined the Twin Lakes as the new north/west division.

Storm Lake Jamboree
From the formation of the conference, the schools, in conjunction with the Storm Lake Times, sponsored an annual basketball preseason challenge held the weekend before the season tip-off. Each of the schools in the Northwest Conference played an exhibition game against another area school, one after another, until the night was capped with one Northwest Conference school (typically the preseason favorite) facing the host, much larger Lakes Conference member Storm Lake High School. The Jamboree was held for both boys and girls and although it did not count on any team's record, the exhibition games served to provide area teams a good idea of what to expect for the upcoming season.

Legacy
Beginning in the 2011–12 school year, all five Northwest Conference schools became members of the Twin Lakes Conference. The five schools remained associated as the conference's northern/western division.

Athletic success
The Northwest Conference was noted for its successful Class 1A basketball teams for most of its history. Throughout the 15 years the conference existed five difference members qualified for the state basketball tournament, accumulating a total of 12 appearances 6 state titles during those years. The six state titles were tied for the most of any conference in the state over those 15 years. Most of the conference schools had great basketball traditions before joining the league as well. The following is a list of state qualifiers:

Men's basketball
Alta, 2006
Laurens-Marathon, 2009
Newell-Fonda, 1997–1st, 1998, 1999–1st, 2000–1st, 2003–2nd, 2004–4th
Pomeroy-Palmer, 1997, 2001–1st, 2002–1st
St. Mary's, 2011–1st
Early-Nemaha, 1970 –1st

Baseball
Alta, 2009
Alta-Aurelia, 2011
Newell-Fonda, 2000, 2005
Schaller-Crestland, 1999
Sioux Central, 1997–2nd, 2003
St. Mary's, 1997, 2002

Men's cross country
Albert City-Truesdale, 2001 (with Laurens-Marathon as LM-ACT)
Alta, 2004
Alta-Aurelia, 2011
Laurens-Marathon, 2008, 2009
Sioux Central, 1997, 1998, 1999, 2005

Men's golf
Newell-Fonda, 2008–2nd

Wrestling
Aurelia, 2007 (with Galva–Holstein as A-G-H)
Schaller-Crestland, 1999

Football
Note: Football was not a conference sport
Albert City-Truesdale, 2002 (with Laurens-Marathon as LM-ACT)
Alta, 2006, 2007, 2008, 2009
Aurelia, 2001–2nd, 2002, 2003, 2006, 2007
Laurens-Marathon, 2008, 2011
Newell-Fonda, 1997, 1999, 2003, 2005, 2006, 2007, 2008, 2010, 2011
Pomeroy-Palmer, 2001
Schaller-Crestland, 2003
Sioux Central, 2003, 2005, 2011

Women's basketball
Newell-Fonda, 1997–2nd, 2000–2nd, 2003, 2008–2nd, 2010, 2011
Sac City, 1998, 1999

Softball
Albert City-Truesdale: 2002
Newell-Fonda: 2005–4th, 2006–2nd, 2008–1st, 2009–2nd, 2010–2nd

Volleyball
Alta, 2010
Schaller-Crestland, 2008, 2009–2nd

References 

http://www.northwestconferenceiowa.org/g5-bin/client.cgi?G5genie=69

High school sports conferences and leagues in the United States
High school sports in Iowa
1996 establishments in Iowa
2011 disestablishments in Iowa
Sports leagues established in 1996
Defunct sports leagues in the United States
Sports leagues disestablished in 2011